"Winner" is a song by English synth-pop duo Pet Shop Boys, released as the lead single from their eleventh studio album, Elysium (2012). It received its UK radio premiere on The Ken Bruce Show on BBC Radio 2 on 2 July 2012. The following day, it was made available for download, followed by a CD single and two digital bundles on 6 August 2012.

The track was featured as BBC Radio 2's "Record of the Week" for the second week of July 2012 and added to the B-list of BBC Radio 2's playlists for three weeks.

Background
Neil Tennant commented that the song "is called 'Winner' and superficially it's a sort of 'We Are the Champions' song but actually it's not. It's really about that moment...and really what's important is the camaraderie of everything that got you there. Enjoy the moment, enjoy the memory 'cause it's just a little moment."

Reception
"Winner" was received generally well. NME stated, "Pet Shop Boys have released one of the most uplifting songs in the history of their songs." The Daily Telegraph said the song was patently timed to match the Olympic mood and "triumphant, low key; a very English take on things". Popjustice commented that the song "kind of works in the context of all the sport in the air at the moment, but as the lead single from a Pet Shop Boys album it's probably the worst since 'Before'", also stating that the three b-sides eclipse the lead song. Metro stated that the single reminds us the pop icons "... do gently persuasive feelgood with panache". The Guardian commented "the Pet Shop Boys kicked that idea round the studio and thought better of it". Daily Star gave the song 9 out of 10 and commented, "deserving a gold medal for cashing in on Olympics fever, the duo's first taste of their new album is a gorgeous epic", and added the song is "such a lovely tune nobody can begrudge them their chance" and it is "a champion performance".

Music video
The music video for "Winner" was directed by Surrender Monkeys and the features the London Rollergirls, a roller derby team, and their new rookie, Dirty Diana, who is transgender. The story highlights the inclusive message of the song and the Rollergirls, an all-women roller derby league that promote charity, teamwork and confidence in women by embracing everyone regardless of body shape, occupations, sexual orientation, race or nationality. Conservative US gay commentator Andrew Sullivan, said it is "one of the very few videos I've seen that actually celebrates the life of the transgender person".

There was positive reception to the video. Film-news.co.uk commented the video is touching. Stereogum described the video as "an inspirational sports montage of sorts, but the inspiration doesn't come from any athletic feats; it comes from the whole community-building side effect".

The Pet Shop Boys received a letter which thanked them for positively showing the transgender community.

Track listings

Charts

References

2012 singles
Pet Shop Boys songs
Songs written by Neil Tennant
Songs written by Chris Lowe
Synth-pop ballads
2012 songs
Parlophone singles
LGBT-related songs